Roger Moore (April 10, 1938 – October 22, 2011) was a professional poker player.

Moore grew up the son of sharecroppers.  He quit school in the eighth grade and soon afterwards entered into military service.  After the military he worked as a civil servant and for fun he would play poker.  When he realized he was making more money playing poker, he quit his job and in 1968 moved to Las Vegas, Nevada.

Moore played at the World Series of Poker regularly, beginning in 1974, and won his bracelet in the $5,000 Seven-Card Stud event in 1994.  He earned a prize of $144,000, in addition to the bracelet, for this win.

His career tournament earnings totaled over $600,000.  He was inducted into the Poker Hall of Fame in 1997.

Moore owned the Pine Bluff Golf Course and Country Club in Eastman, Georgia.

He had two children.

External links
Poker Books interview
Hendon Mob tournament results
OnlinePoker.net: Legend Roger Moore Dead Aged 73

American poker players
World Series of Poker bracelet winners
People from Eastman, Georgia
People from the Las Vegas Valley
American businesspeople
2011 deaths
1938 births
Poker Hall of Fame inductees